Gurruwiwi is a surname of the Yolngu, an Aboriginal Australian people of Arnhem Land, Northern Territory of Australia, and family members have close connections with the Yunupingu and Marika families.

Notable people with the surname include:
Djalu Gurruwiwi (1935–2022), yidaki player
Gali Yalkarriwuy Gurruwiwi (1942–2020), artist
Larry Gurruwiwi, musician, son of Djalu
Leila Gurruwiwi (born 1988), media commentator and TV producer
Mithinarri Gurruwiwi (1929–1976), artist